Neuropsychological assessment was traditionally carried out to assess the extent of impairment to a particular skill and to attempt to determine the area of the brain which may have been damaged following brain injury or neurological illness. With the advent of neuroimaging techniques, location of space-occupying lesions can now be more accurately determined through this method, so the focus has now moved on to the assessment of cognition and behaviour, including examining the effects of any brain injury or neuropathological process that a person may have experienced.

A core part of neuropsychological assessment is the administration of neuropsychological tests for the formal assessment of cognitive function, though neuropsychological testing is more than the administration and scoring of tests and screening tools.  It is essential that neuropsychological assessment also include an evaluation of the person's mental status.  This is especially true in assessment of Alzheimer's disease and other forms of dementia. Aspects of cognitive functioning that are assessed typically include orientation, new-learning/memory, intelligence, language, visuoperception, and executive function. However, clinical neuropsychological assessment is more than this and also focuses on a person's psychological, personal, interpersonal and wider contextual circumstances.

Assessment may be carried out for a variety of reasons, such as:
 Clinical evaluation, to understand the pattern of cognitive strengths as well as any difficulties a person may have, and to aid decision making for use in a medical or rehabilitation environment.
 Scientific investigation, to examine a hypothesis about the structure and function of cognition to be tested, or to provide information that allows experimental testing to be seen in context of a wider cognitive profile.
 Medico-legal assessment, to be used in a court of law as evidence in a legal claim or criminal investigation.

Miller outlined three broad goals of neuropsychological assessment.  Firstly, diagnosis, to determine the nature of the underlying problem.  Secondly, to understand the nature of any brain injury or resulting cognitive problem (see neurocognitive deficit) and its impact on the individual, as a means of devising a rehabilitation programme or offering advice as to an individual's ability to carry out certain tasks (for example, fitness to drive, or returning to work).  And lastly, assessments may be undertaken to measure change in functioning over time, such as to determine the consequences of a surgical procedure or the impact of a rehabilitation programme over time.

Diagnosis of a neuropsychological disorder 
Certain types of damage to the brain will cause behavioral and cognitive difficulties. Psychologists can start screening for these problems by using either one of the following techniques or all of these combined:

History taking 

This includes gathering medical history of the patient and their family, presence or absence of developmental milestones, psychosocial history, and character, severity, and progress of any history of complaints. The psychologist can then gauge how to treat the patient and determine if there are any historical determinants for his or her behavior.

Interviewing 

Psychologists use structured interviews in order to determine what kind of neurological problem the patient might be experiencing. There are a number of specific interviews, including the Short Portable Mental Status Questionnaire, Neuropsychological Impairment Scale, Patient's Assessment of Own Functioning, and Structured Interview for the Diagnosis of Dementia.

Test-taking 

Scores on standardized tests of adequate predictive validity predictor well current and/or future problems. Standardized tests allow psychologists to compare a person's results with other people's because it has the same components and is given in the same way. It is therefore representative of the person's's behavior and cognition. The results of a standardized test are only part of the jigsaw. Further, multidisciplinary investigations (e.g. neuroimaging, neurological) are typically needed to officially diagnose a brain-injured patient.

Intelligence testing 

Testing one's intelligence can also give a clue to whether there is a problem in the brain-behavior connection. The Wechsler Scales are the tests most often used to determine level of intelligence. The variety of scales available, the nature of the tasks, as well as a wide gap in verbal and performance scores can give clues to whether there is a learning disability or damage to a certain area of the brain.

Testing other areas 
Other areas are also tested when a patient goes through neuropsychological assessment. These can include sensory perception, motor functions, attention, memory, auditory and visual processing, language, problem solving, planning, organization, speed of processing, and many others. Neuropsychological assessment can test many areas of cognitive and executive functioning to determine whether a patient's difficulty in function and behavior has a neuropsychological basis.

Information gathered from assessment 
Tsatsanis and Volkmar believe that assessment can provide unique information about the type of disorder a patient has which allows the psychologist to come up with a treatment plan. Neuropsychological assessment can clarify the nature of the disorder and determine the cognitive functioning associated with a disorder. Assessment can also allow the psychologist to understand the developmental progress of the disorder in order to predict future problems and come up with a successful treatment package. Different assessments can also determine if a patient will be at risk for a particular disorder. It is important to remember, however, that assessing a patient at one time is not enough to go ahead and continue treatment because of the changes in behavior that can occur frequently. A patient must be retested multiple times in order to make sure that the current treatment is still the right treatment. For neuropsychological assessments, researchers discover the different areas of the brain that is damaged based on the cognitive and behavioral aspects of the patient.

Benefits of assessment 
The most beneficial factor of neuropsychological assessment is that is provides an accurate diagnosis of the disorder for the patient when it is unclear to the psychologist what exactly he/she has. This allows for accurate treatment later on in the process because treatment is driven by the exact symptoms of the disorder and how a specific patient may react to different treatments. The assessment allows the psychologist and patient to understand the severity of the deficit and to allow better decision-making by both parties. It is also helpful in understanding deteriorating diseases because the patient can be assessed multiple times to see how the disorder is progressing.

One area where neuropsychological assessments can be beneficial is in forensic cases where the defendant's competency is being questioned due to possible brain injury or damage. A neuropsychological assessment may show brain damage when neuroimaging has failed. It can also determine whether the individual is faking a disorder (malingering) in order to attain a lesser sentence.

Most neuropsychological testing can be completed in 6 to 12 hours or less. This time, however, does not include the role of the psychologist interpreting the data, scoring the test, making formulations, and writing a formal report.

Qualifications for conducting assessments 

Neuropsychological assessments are usually conducted by doctoral-level (Ph.D., Psy.D.) psychologists trained in neuropsychology, known as clinical neuropsychologists. The definition and scope of a clinical neuropsychologist is outlined in the widely accepted Houston Conference Guidelines. They will usually have postdoctoral training in neuropsychology, neuroanatomy, and brain function. Most will be licensed and practicing psychologists in their particular field.  Recent developments in the field allow for highly trained individuals such as psychometrists to administer selected instruments, though determinations regarding testing results remain the responsibility of the doctor.

See also 

 
 
 
 
 
 
 
 , such as psychometrics

References

Further reading
 
 
 
 
 
  This standard reference book includes entries by Kimford J. Meador, Ida Sue Baron, Steven J. Loring, Kerry deS. Hamsher, Nils R. Varney, Gregory P. Lee, Esther Strauss, and Tessa Hart.
 
  This collection of articles for practitioners includes chapters by Linda A. Reddy, Adam S. Weissman, James B. Hale, Allison Waters, Lara J. Farrell, Elizabeth Schilpzand, Susanna W. Chang, Joseph O'Neill, David Rosenberg, Steven G. Feifer, Gurmal Rattan, Patricia D. Walshaw, Carrie E. Bearden, Carmen Lukie, Andrea N. Schneider, Richard Gallagher, Jennifer L. Rosenblatt, Jean Séguin, Mathieu Pilon, Matthew W. Specht, Susanna W. Chang, Kathleen Armstrong, Jason Hangauer, Heather Agazzi, Justin J. Boseck, Elizabeth L. Roberds, Andrew S. Davis, Joanna Thome, Tina Drossos, Scott J. Hunter, Erin L. Steck-Silvestri, LeAdelle Phelps, William S. MacAllister, Jonelle Ensign, Emilie Crevier-Quintin, Leonard F. Koziol, and Deborah E. Budding.

External links